LMS Stanier Class 5 4-6-0 No. 44871 is a preserved British steam locomotive. It was built at Crewe Works in 1945.

Service history 

4871 is an LMS Stanier Class 5 4-6-0 locomotive, originally numbered 4871 by the LMS and having 40000 added to its number under British Railways after nationalisation in 1948. 44871 was one of the last steam locomotives to be withdrawn from service, surviving until 1968, the last year of steam on British Rail. She was also one of four locomotives chosen (among two other members of her class) to take part in the famous Fifteen Guinea Special on Sun 11 August 1968. 44871 was in-charge of the Carlisle Citadel to Manchester Victoria leg of the tour which went south down the Settle and Carlisle Line. On this leg of the tour she double headed with 44781, 44871 acted as the pilot engine with 44781 being the train engine. 44871 is one of only three from that train to survive, the others being 45110 and 70013 Oliver Cromwell.

Preservation 
44871 was purchased directly from British Rail service for preservation, and so never had to be restored from scrapyard condition unlike other preserved locomotives which were sent to Barry Island. The majority of the Class 5s were purchased directly for preservation, with only six being purchased from Barry Island and thus requiring restoration to run again.

Following withdrawal from revenue service 44871 remained at Carnforth, which would later become the Steamtown museum. Once the ban on operating steam locomotives over the national network was lifted in 1972, 44871 was used to operate mainline trains to places like York. It was during this period that she was given the name Sovereign. 44871 was also a popular engine in Scotland, working trains along the West Highland Line from Fort William to Mallaig (which she still runs decades later) working West Coast Railways "Jacobite trains" for most of the year, alongside sister No. 45407 The Lancashire Fusilierand and LNER K1 No. 62005.

Following years of storage and the death of her owner in 2006, 44871 was purchased by Ian Riley and was taken to Bury for an overhaul to mainline standards. She returned to steam in 2009 and later undertook light and loaded test runs on the mainline alongside use on WCR's "Jacobite" trains. In the summer of 2010, she worked the final season of WCR's "Cambrian" trains along the Cambrian Line from Machynlleth to Pwllheli (the trains on Monday, Wednesday, and Friday ran to Pwllheli while the trains on Tuesday Thursday ran to Porthmadog). It isn't currently possible to run steam trains down the Cambrian line since they are incompatible with the new ERTMS system that was put in place.

In August 2010, 44871 was featured in an episode of Coronation Street where she hauled Roy and Hayley Cropper's wedding train. 44871 carried 45407's "Lancashire Fusilier" nameplates for the occasion.

Current status 
44871 is based at the East Lancashire Railway alongside sibling No. 45407 The Lancashire Fusilier, both of which are mainline certified regular used for West Coast Railways Jacobite along the West Highland Line from Fort William to Mallaig and back. She returned to service in August 2017 following the completion of another heavy overhaul which was done to mainline standards as before.

In Summer 2021, 44871 was hired by the North Yorkshire Moors Railway, working between Whitby and Pickering, North Yorkshire.

Gallery 

44871
Preserved London, Midland and Scottish Railway steam locomotives
Individual locomotives of Great Britain
Railway locomotives introduced in 1945
Standard gauge steam locomotives of Great Britain